Drimys granadensis is a broadleaf evergreen tree of family Winteraceae. it is native to tropical montane forests from Peru to southern Mexico.

Common names in Mexico include al-ca-puc, cashiquec, chachaca, chilillo, palo picante, palo de chile, yaga-bziga, and vaya-yiña.

Description
Drimys granadensis is an evergreen shrub or small tree, up to 12 meters tall, with large white flowers.

Range and habitat
Drimys granadensis ranges from Peru through Ecuador, Colombia, Venezuela, and Central America to southern Mexico. It is typical of mature montane cloud forests of the Northern Andes, Central American Cordillera, and the mountains of southern Mexico.

In southern Mexico it is found in cloud forests, and in riparian zones and well-watered ravines in humid oak forests and pine–oak forests, from 1,100 to 3,300 meters elevation.

Subspecies
There are five accepted varieties:
 Drimys granadensis var. chiriquiensis A.C.Sm. – Panama
 Drimys granadensis var. granadensis – Peru, Ecuador, Colombia, northwest Venezuela
 Drimys granadensis var. mexicana  (DC.) A.C.Sm. – Mexico (Veracruz, Puebla, Guerrero, Oaxaca, and Chiapas states), Guatemala, El Salvador, Honduras, Nicaragua, and Costa Rica
 Drimys granadensis var. peruviana  A.C.Sm. – Peru
 Drimys granadensis var. uniflora  (Turcz.) A.C.Sm. – northwest Venezuela

References

External links

granadensis
Flora of western South America
Flora of Central America
Flora of Mexico
Cloud forest flora of Mexico
Flora of the Central American montane forests
Flora of the Andes
Flora of the Talamancan montane forests
Flora of the northwestern Andean montane forests